Alexander Romeo Robinson (born December 5, 1985) is a Liberian football player who currently plays for Persiba Balikpapan in the Indonesia Super League.

References

External links
Alexander Romeo Robinson at Liga Indonesia

1985 births
Living people
Liberian footballers
Liberian expatriate footballers
Liberian expatriate sportspeople in Indonesia
Expatriate footballers in Indonesia
Indonesian Premier Division players
Liga 1 (Indonesia) players
Persekabpas Pasuruan players
Persela Lamongan players
Persipasi Bekasi players
Perseman Manokwari players
Persibo Bojonegoro players
Persiba Balikpapan players
Association football midfielders